Bellegarde (Languedocien: Bèlagarda) is a former commune of the Tarn department of southern France. On 1 January 2016, it was merged into the new commune of Bellegarde-Marsal.

See also
Communes of the Tarn department

References

Former communes of Tarn (department)
Populated places disestablished in 2016